Édith Moskovic (12 August 1931 – 8 June 2021) was a French Holocaust survivor and activist.

In 2009, she was made a knight of the Legion of Honor.

References 

Holocaust survivors
1931 births
2021 deaths
Hungarian Jews
French people of Hungarian-Jewish descent
Chevaliers of the Légion d'honneur
People from Vynohradiv